Jacob Joseph Pugsley (January 25, 1838 – February 5, 1920) was an American lawyer and politician who served two terms as a U.S. Representative from Ohio from 1887 to 1891.

Biography 
Born in Dutchess County, New York, Pugsley moved to Ohio with his parents in 1839.
He graduated from Miami University, Oxford, Ohio.
He studied law.
He was admitted to the bar and commenced practice in Dayton, Ohio.
He moved to Hillsboro, Ohio, and continued the practice of law.

In 1866, he married Cornelia Dabney Price.  They had a daughter, Nannie Price Pugsley.

Political career 
He served as a member of the State house of representatives 1880–1883.
He served in the Ohio Senate in 1886 and 1887.

Pugsley was elected as a Republican to the Fiftieth and Fifty-first Congresses (March 4, 1887 – March 3, 1891).
He was not a candidate for renomination in 1890.

Death 
He died in Hillsboro, Ohio on February 5, 1920.
He was interred in Hillsboro Cemetery.

References

Sources

External links

1838 births
1920 deaths
People from Dutchess County, New York
People from Hillsboro, Ohio
Ohio lawyers
Republican Party Ohio state senators
Republican Party members of the Ohio House of Representatives
Miami University alumni
19th-century American lawyers
Republican Party members of the United States House of Representatives from Ohio